Events from the year 1905 in Scotland.

Incumbents 

 Secretary for Scotland and Keeper of the Great Seal – Andrew Murray until 2 February; then The Marquess of Linlithgow until 4 December; then John Sinclair

Law officers 
 Lord Advocate – Charles Dickson until December; then Thomas Shaw
 Solicitor General for Scotland – David Dundas; then Edward Theodore Salvesen; then James Avon Clyde; then Alexander Ure

Judiciary 
 Lord President of the Court of Session and Lord Justice General – Lord Blair Balfour until 22 January; then from 4 February Lord Dunedin
 Lord Justice Clerk – Lord Kingsburgh

Events 
 January – Strathaven Academy opens.
 28 September – Talla Reservoir officially opened to serve the Edinburgh district after 10 years of construction (supply begins May).
 31 October – Perth Corporation Tramways commence electric operation.
 18 November – First rugby match between New Zealand and Scotland, played at Murrayfield.
 19 November – 39 men are killed in a fire at a model lodging house in Watson Street, Glasgow.
 St Paul's Cathedral, Dundee, raised to cathedral status in the Episcopal Church.
 David Couper Thomson sets up the Dundee publisher D. C. Thomson & Co.
 Scottish Motor Traction is set up in Edinburgh as a motor bus operator.
 Victoria Bridge, Mar Lodge Estate, erected.
 Approximate date – the earliest Rolls-Royce 10 hp car to survive into the 21st century is acquired by Kenneth Gillies of Tain; it remains in Scotland until the time of World War I.

Births 
 6 April – Johnny Ramensky, career criminal, employed as a commando for his safe-cracking abilities (died 1972) 
 19 April – Jim Mollison, aviator (died 1959)
 12 May – Alex Jackson, international footballer (died 1946)
 12 July – John Maxwell, landscape painter (died 1962) 
 19 July – Robert Hurd, influential conservation architect (died 1963)
 20 August – Duncan Macrae, actor (died 1967)
 6 September – William McEwan Younger, brewer and Unionist politician (died 1992 in England)
 4 October – Leslie Mitchell, announcer (died 1985 in London)
 9 December – Janet Adam Smith, writer and mountaineer (died 1999)
 Norman Cameron, poet (born in Bombay; died 1953 in London)
 Fred Hartley, light music composer and conductor (died 1980)

Deaths 
 21 January – Robert Brough, painter, died in a railway disaster (born 1872)
 5 August – Alexander Asher, Liberal politician and Solicitor General for Scotland (born 1834)
 16 August – Jamie Anderson, golfer (born 1842)
 22 August – David Binning Monro, Homeric scholar (born 1836)
 18 September – George MacDonald, author, poet and Christian minister (born 1844)
 8 October – Allan MacDonald, Roman Catholic priest, poet, folklore collector and activist (born 1859)
 27 October – Ralph Copeland, Astronomer Royal for Scotland (born 1837 in England)
 7 November – Lady Florence Caroline Dixie, traveller, war correspondent, writer and feminist (born 1855)  
 12 December – William Sharp, poet and literary biographer (born 1855)

The arts
 16 January – Neil Munro begins publishing his Vital Spark stories in the Glasgow Evening News.
 Harry Lauder writes the popular song "I Love a Lassie".

See also 
 Timeline of Scottish history
 1905 in the United Kingdom

References 

 
Scotland
1900s in Scotland